A Canadien or French Canadian is a Canadian of French descent and language.

Canadiens, Canadien, Canadienne or Canadiennes, may also refer to:

Sports teams
Montreal Canadiens, Canadian professional ice hockey team (founded 1910)
Les Canadiens, name of the Montreal Canadiens in their first season, 1910
Hull-Ottawa Canadiens, Canadian semi-professional ice hockey franchise (1959–1963)
Lakeshore Canadiens, Canadian junior ice hockey team (founded 1978 as the Belle River Canadiens, renamed 2014)
 Montreal Junior Canadiens, Canadian junior ice hockey team (1933–1972)
Sherbrooke Canadiens, Canadian professional ice hockey team (1984–1990)
St. Boniface Canadiens, Canadian junior ice hockey team, formerly Winnipeg Canadiens and later Winnipeg Warriors (1952–1964)
St. Paul Canadiens, Canadian junior ice hockey team (founded 1991)
Toronto Jr. Canadiens, Canadian junior ice hockey team (founded 1972)
Les Canadiennes de Montreal, Canadian women's ice hockey team

Political parties
Parti canadien, early 19th-century Canadian political party
Parti canadien (1942), Canadian political party (1942 – c. 1944)

Other uses
Canadienne cattle, breed of cattle
Le Canadien, short-lived Canadian newspaper (1806–1810)
La Canadienne, early name for the Canadian Women's Open golf tournament
Tour des Canadiens, residential skyscraper in Montreal, completed in 2016

See also

Canadian (disambiguation)
 
 

Route Transcanadienne